Saint-Sauveur was a former provincial electoral district in the Capitale-Nationale region of Quebec, Canada.

It was created for the 1890 election from part of Québec-Est electoral district.  Its final election was in 1970.  It disappeared in the 1973 election and its successor electoral districts were Taschereau and Vanier.

Members of the Legislative Assembly / National Assembly
 Simon-Napoléon Parent, Liberal (1890–1905)
 Charles-Eugène Côté, Liberal (1905–1909)
 Joseph-Alphonse Langlois, Parti ouvrier (1909–1916)
 Arthur Paquet, Liberal (1916–1923)
 Pierre Bertrand, Parti ouvrier (1923–1927)
 Charles-Édouard Cantin, Liberal (1927–1931)
 Pierre Bertrand, Conservative Party – Union Nationale (1931–1939)
 Wilfrid Hamel, Liberal (1939–1948)
 Francis Boudreau, Union Nationale (1948–1970)
 Armand Bois, Ralliement creditiste (1970–1973)

References
 Election results (National Assembly)
 Election results (QuebecPolitique.com)

Former provincial electoral districts of Quebec